The March 84G was a mid-engined Group C and IMSA racing sports prototype, designed and developed by March Engineering in late 1983 and used in sports car racing until 1989. It was powered by a number of different engines, including a Chevrolet small-block, a Buick V6, a Porsche flat-six, and even a Mazda 13B Wankel rotary engine. It only managed to score 5 wins, and clinch a total of 10 podium, over the course of 7 years and 119 race entries.

References

Racing cars
March vehicles
Sports prototypes
IMSA GTP cars
Group C cars